Andrew Lost is a series of children's science fiction adventure novels written by J. C. Greenburg and published by Random House from 2002 to 2008. It features a boy inventor named Andrew Dubble whose inventions rarely work the way he expects them to. There are 18 books in the series and they constitute five complete stories, each released consecutively.

The chapter books were illustrated by Debbie Palen (volumes 1–4), Mike Reed (5–6), and Jan Gerardi (7–18).

Characters

 Andrew Dubble — Andrew is the main character of the series. He is ten years old; he apparently comes from a wealthy family, because they can afford their own helicopter and Andrew travels to various places in the world periodically. Andrew loves to invent things. He invented The Atom Sucker in books 1–4 and the Goa Constrictor in books 13–16. Usually his inventions go awry, resulting in a series of books where Andrew is constantly trying to set things right again.
 Judy Dubble — Judy is Andrew's 13-year-old cousin. Although she does not like Andrew very much, she is usually stuck with him and is with him for most of the story.
 THUDD — Thudd is a robot that was given to Andrew by his Uncle Al for his seventh birthday. His name stands for The Handy Ultra-Digital Detective. THUDD is small enough to fit inside Andrew's pocket. THUDD talks in a squeaky voice and his sentences are always preceded by a "meep" noise. THUDD knows everything and constantly points out scientific facts to Andrew and Judy. Judy is not always tolerant of THUDD's superior knowledge, and once threatened to take out his batteries if he wouldn't stop talking. THUDD's most important rule is that he must never get wet.
 Uncle Al — Andrew's uncle is a scientist who probably has invented more than Andrew has. He sometimes treats his nephew Andrew to various gadgets (including Thudd). Uncle Al usually has a role in the plot of the story, but is not usually present while Andrew, Judy, and THUDD are off having an adventure.

Plots

Books 1–4
Illustrated by Debbie Palen (2002–2003).

The first book, Andrew Lost on the Dog begins just after Andrew has finished building the Atom Sucker. He is testing it when he accidentally shrinks himself, Judy, Thudd, and a helicopter to the size of a dust mite. He and Judy are inhaled by a neighborhood dog named Harley and spend the next few hours trying to climb up its head. However, Harley's owner, Mrs. Scuttle, sends Harley inside for a bath and Andrew, Judy, and Thudd fall off Harley's body. The second book, Andrew Lost in the Bathroom begins. Andrew blows his Umbubble, a kind of bubble gum that can be blown big enough to accommodate a person (another of Andrew's inventions). Andrew, Judy, and Thudd float around the bathroom in the Umbubble, trying to escape and get back to the Atom Sucker. But before they can get out, they are accidentally flushed down the toilet by Mrs. Scuttle. The third book, Andrew Lost in the Kitchen begins. Andrew, Judy, and Thudd float through the sewer pipes but manage to go out of the kitchen drain. The Umbubble is soon punctured by the green part of a tomato, and Andrew, Judy, and Thudd have to try to get back to the Atom Sucker without it. They manage to catch a ride on a housefly and they fly outside into the garden. The fourth book, Andrew Lost in the Garden, begins. Andrew and Judy try to walk through the garden and get back to the Atom Sucker, while Mrs. Scuttle is having a garden party. They run into many garden insects and microorganisms in the garden. They eventually find their helicopter, and they fly to the Atom Sucker and unshrink themselves.

Characters
 Harley; the name of a friendly basset hound that belongs to Mrs. Scuttle.
 Mrs. Scuttle; Andrew's grumpy neighbor and Harley's owner.

Books 5–8
Illustrated by Mike Reed (2003) and Jan Gerardi (2004).

The fifth book, Andrew Lost Under Water, begins when Andrew and Judy are at Hawaii with Uncle Al. They accidentally lock themselves inside the Water Bug, a car that Uncle Al turned into a submarine. As they explore underwater, they soon discover that a giant squid is being pursued by a villain called Soggy Bob Sloggins and his robot parrot BURPP (Bob's Ultra Robot Parrot Partner) who wants to capture it. In the sixth book, Andrew Lost in the Whale, they are swallowed by a whale and escape by crawling through its digestive tract, including the stomach, intestines, and anus. In the seventh book, Andrew Lost on the Reef, Andrew and Judy explore a coral reef, and in the eighth book, Andrew Lost in the Deep, they travel to the deepest part of the ocean. At the end of the book, they discover that Soggy Bob Sloggins is not really the villain, but was hypnotized and forced to do evil. They discover that the real enemy is the man who hypnotized him, Doctor Kron-Tox.

Characters
 Soggy Bob Sloggins; a villain trying to capture the giant squid.
 BURPP; A robot parrot that belongs to Soggy Bob.

Books 9–12
Illustrated by Jan Gerardi (2004–2005).

The ninth book, Andrew Lost in Time, begins when Andrew, Judy, Thudd, and Uncle Al are in a cabin in Montana, when Doctor Kron-Tox kidnaps Uncle Al and sends him back in time to the ice age. Andrew, Judy, and Thudd run into the Time-a-tron, the time machine that Uncle Al invented, and go back in time to rescue him. They accidentally go back too far and end up three minutes after the Big Bang. They quickly go forwards in time. In the tenth book, Andrew Lost on Earth, they watch the Earth being formed. They stop in the Carboniferous period and rescue a boy named Beeper, the nephew of Doctor Kron-Tox, who had been stranded there by his uncle. In the eleventh book, Andrew Lost with the Dinosaurs, they stop in the Late Cretaceous period and rescue Doctor Winka Wilde, a woman who was stranded just before the extinction at the end of the Cretaceous period. In the twelfth book, Andrew Lost in the Ice Age, they make it to the ice age. There they rescue Uncle Al, and stop Doctor Kron-Tox from building a theme park with animals he captured. Then they finally return to the present time.

Characters
 Doctor Kron-Tox; an evil scientist who is trying to capture exotic animals for his amusement park. Doctor Kron-Tox travels through time in the Tick-Tock Box, and in book #12 we realize that he also uses the Tick-Tock Box to store his captured animals.
 Beeper is Doctor Kron Tox's nephew. He is very friendly, but is often annoying, especially to Judy.

Books 13–16
Illustrated by Jan Gerardi (2006–2007).

The thirteenth book, Andrew Lost in the Garbage, begins when Andrew, Judy, and Thudd are shrunk to about an inch tall (not as small as in the Atom Sucker incident) and thrown out with the garbage due to an accident with Andrew's newest invention, the Goa Constrictor, and his classmate, Jeremy Bogart. They end up at the city dump, and when they try to escape, they are thrown onto a flying bat. The fourteenth book, Andrew Lost with the Bats, starts here.  The bat flies them to a cave, where they travel deep inside and find an opening to the ground.  They then climb onto an Arctic tern to escape the bug-eating snakes and other things, and the tern flies them to an Australian jungle, where the fifteenth book, Andrew Lost in the Jungle, starts.  Andrew and Judy then make contact with Uncle Al, who flies to Australia and asks them to get in a river and float downstream to where he can catch them.  Andrew and Judy then use the Umbubble (which first appeared in book 2) to float to where Uncle Al is waiting.  He picks them up, but a mysterious force causes them to shrink down to a microscopic size (possibly even smaller than in the Atom Sucker incident).  Then a mosquito bites Uncle Al right where they are sitting on his hand, and the mosquito's snout pushes them inside Uncle Al's body, which is where Andrew Lost in Uncle Al begins.

Books 17-18
Illustrated by Jan Gerardi (2008).

Andrew, Judy, and Thudd, reduced to the size of ants, face dangers when caught up by a dust devil in the Australian desert (Andrew Lost in the Desert) and a pond full of frogs (Andrew Lost with the Frogs).

Books

 Andrew Lost on the Dog (2002) 86 pages, illustrated by Debbie Palen (1–4)
 Andrew Lost in the Bathroom (2002) 88 pages
 Andrew Lost in the Kitchen (2002)  88 pages
 Andrew Lost in the Garden (2003) 86 pages
 Andrew Lost Under Water (2003) 88 pages, illus. Mike Reed (5–6)
 Andrew Lost in the Whale (2003) 90 pages
 Andrew Lost on the Reef (2004) 90 pages, illus. Jan Gerardi (7–8)
 Andrew Lost in the Deep (2004) 90 pages
 Andrew Lost in Time (2004) 90 pages, illus. Jan Gerardi (9–12)
 Andrew Lost on Earth (2005) 90 pages
 Andrew Lost with the Dinosaurs (2005) 90 pages
 Andrew Lost in the Ice Age (2005) 90 pages
 Andrew Lost in the Garbage (2006) 90 pages, illus. Jan Gerardi (13–16)
 Andrew Lost with the Bats (2006) 90 pages
 Andrew Lost in the Jungle (2007) 90 pages
 Andrew Lost in Uncle Al (2007) 90 pages
 Andrew Lost in the Desert (2008) 90 pages, illus. Jan Gerardi (17–18)
 Andrew Lost with the Frogs (2008) 90 pages

References

External links

 
 Original Website (although it is very out-of-date)
 Random House webpage
 Andrew Lost at Kidsreads.com
 Kids@Random webpage

Series of children's books
Children's science fiction novels
American children's novels
Novels by J. C. Greenburg
2000s children's books